Marta Amalia Obminska, (born 1 August 1979 in Poland is a Swedish politician for the Moderate Party and an MP in the Riksdagen between 2010 and 2014, and again from 2015. She was elected into the Riksdagen from Uppsala constituency at place 6.

References

External links 

Living people
1979 births
Members of the Riksdag 2010–2014